Andrew McEwan "Max" Hislop (25 August 1895 – 10 July 1964) was an Australian rules footballer who played in the Victorian Football League (VFL) in 1914 for the Collingwood Football Club, one game in 1915 for the Melbourne Football Club and then between 1917 and 1924 and finally in 1927 for the Richmond Football Club, after moving to Tasmania to coach New Town in 1925 and 1926.

Notes

References
Hogan P: The Tigers Of Old, Richmond FC, Melbourne 1996

External links

1895 births
1964 deaths
Australian rules footballers from Victoria (Australia)
Australian Rules footballers: place kick exponents
Richmond Football Club players
Richmond Football Club Premiership players
Collingwood Football Club players
Melbourne Football Club players
Glenorchy Football Club coaches
Glenorchy Football Club players
Two-time VFL/AFL Premiership players